, also known as Okakura Tenshin , was a Japanese scholar and art critic who in the era of Meiji Restoration reform defended traditional forms, customs and beliefs. Outside Japan, he is chiefly renowned for The Book of Tea: A Japanese Harmony of Art, Culture, and the Simple Life (1906). Written in English, and in the wake of the Russo-Japanese War, it decried Western caricaturing of the Japanese, and of Asians more generally, and expressed the fear that Japan gained respect only to the extent that it adopted the barbarities of Western militarism.

Early life and education
The second son of Okakura Kan'emon, a former Fukui Domain treasurer turned silk merchant, and Kan'emon's second wife, Kakuzō was named for the corner warehouse (角蔵) in which he was born, but later changed the spelling of his name to different Kanji meaning "awakened boy" (覚三).

Okakura learned English while attending a school operated by a Christian missionary, Dr. James Curtis Hepburn, of the Hepburn romanization system. At 15, he entered the newly renamed Tokyo Imperial University, where he first met and studied under the Harvard-educated art historian Ernest Fenollosa.

Career 
In 1886, Okakura became secretary to the minister of education and was put in charge of musical affairs. Later in the same year he was named to the Imperial Art Commission and sent abroad to study fine arts in the Western world. After his return from Europe and the United States, in 1887 he helped found, and a year later became director of, the Tokyo School of Fine Arts (東京美術学校 Tōkyō Bijutsu Gakkō).

The new arts school represented "the first serious reaction to the lifeless conservatism" of traditionalists and the "equally uninspired imitation of western art" fostered by early Meiji enthusiasts. Limiting himself to more sympathetic aspects of art in the West, at the school, and in a new periodical  Kokka, Okakura sought to rehabilitate ancient and native arts, honoring their ideals and exploring their possibilities. When, in 1897, it became clear that European methods were to be given ever increasing prominence in the school curriculum, he resigned his directorship. Six months later he renewed the effort, as he saw it, to draw on western art without impairing national inspiration in the Nihon Bijutsuin (日本美術院, lit. "Japan Visual Arts Academy"), founded with Hashimoto Gahō and Yokoyama Taikan and thirty-seven other leading artists.

At the same time, Okakura had opposed the Shintoist Haibutsu Kishaku movement which, in the wake of the Meiji Restoration had sought to expel Buddhism from Japan. With Ernest Fenollosa, he worked to repair damaged Buddhist temples, images and texts.

Okakura was a high-profile urbanite who retained an international sense of self. He wrote all of his main works in English. Okakura researched Japan's traditional art and traveled to Europe, the United States and China, and lived two years in India during which he engaged in dialogue with Swami Vivekananda and Rabindranath Tagore. Okakura emphasised the importance to the modern world of Asian culture, attempting to bring its influence to realms of art and literature that, in his day, were largely dominated by Western culture. In 1906, he was invited by William Sturgis Bigelow to the Museum of Fine Arts, Boston and became the Curator of its Department of Japanese and Chinese Art in 1910.

Works 

His 1903 book on Asian artistic and cultural history, The Ideals of the East with Special Reference to the Art of Japan, published on the eve of the Russo-Japanese War, is famous for its opening paragraph in which he sees a spiritual unity throughout Asia, which distinguishes it from the West:

Asia is one.  The Himalayas divide, only to accentuate, two mighty civilisations, the Chinese with its communism of Confucius, and the Indian with its individualism of the Vedas. But not even the snowy barriers can interrupt for one moment that broad expanse of love for the Ultimate and Universal, which is the common thought-inheritance of every Asiatic race, enabling them to produce all the great religions of the world, and distinguishing them from those maritime peoples of the Mediterranean and the Baltic, who love to dwell on the Particular, and to search out the means, not the end, of life.

In his subsequent book, The Awakening of Japan, published in 1904, he argued that "the glory of the West is the humiliation of Asia." This was an early expression of Pan-Asianism. In this book Okakura also noted that Japan's rapid modernization was not universally applauded in Asia: ″We have become so eager to identify ourselves with European civilization instead of Asiatic that our continental neighbors regard us as renegades—nay, even as an embodiment of the White Disaster itself."

In The Book of Tea, written and published in 1906, has been described as "the earliest lucid English-language account of Zen Buddhism and its relation to the arts". Okakura argued that "Tea is more than an idealization of the form of drinking; it is a religion of the art of life". [Teaism] insulates purity and harmony, the mystery of mutual charity, the romanticism of the social order. It is essentially a worship of the Imperfect, as it is a tender attempt to accomplish something possible in this impossible thing we know as life. None of this, he suggested, was appreciated by the Westerner. In his "sleek complacency", the Westerner views the tea ceremony as but "another instance of the thousand and one oddities which constitute and childishness of the East to him". Writing in the aftermath of the Russo-Japanese War, Okakura commented that the Westerner regarded Japan as "barbarous while she indulged in the gentle arts of peace", and began to call her civilized only when "she began to commit wholesale slaughter on the Manchurian battlefields".

Okakura's final work, The White Fox, written under the patronage of Isabella Stewart Gardner in 1912, was an English-language libretto for the Boston Opera House. The libretto incorporates elements from both kabuki plays and Wagner's epicTannhäuser and may understood, metaphorically, as an expression of Okakura's hoped-for reconciliation of East and West. Charles Martin Loeffler agreed to Garner's request to put the poetic drama to music, but the project was never staged.

Death 
Okakura's health deteriorated in his later years. "My ailment the doctors say is the usual complaint of the twentieth century—Bright's disease," he wrote a friend in June 1913. "I have eaten things in various parts of the globe—too varied for the hereditary notions of my stomach and kidneys. However I am getting well again and I am thinking of going to China in September." In August, 1913, "Kakuzo insisted on going to his mountain villa in Akakura, and finally his wife, daughter and his sister took him there by train. For a week or so, Kakuzo felt a little better and was able to talk with people, but on August 25, he had a heart attack and spent several days in great pain. Surrounded by his family, relatives and his disciples, he passed away on September 2."

Legacy

In Japan, Okakura, along with Fenollosa, is credited with "saving" Nihonga, or painting done with traditional Japanese technique, as it was threatened with replacement by Western-style painting, or "Yōga", whose chief advocate was artist Kuroda Seiki. In fact this role, most assiduously pressed after Okakura's death by his followers, is not taken seriously by art scholars today, nor is the idea that oil painting posed any serious "threat" to traditional Japanese painting. Yet Okakura was certainly instrumental in modernizing Japanese aesthetics, having recognized the need to preserve Japan's cultural heritage, and thus was one of the major reformers during Japan's period of modernization beginning with the Meiji Restoration.

Outside Japan, Okakura influenced a number of important figures, directly or indirectly, who include Swami Vivekananda, philosopher Martin Heidegger, poet Ezra Pound, and especially poet Rabindranath Tagore and heiress Isabella Stewart Gardner, who were close personal friends of his.  He was also one of a trio of Japanese artists who introduced the wash technique to Abanindranath Tagore, the father of modern Indian watercolor.

As part of the Izura Institute of Arts & Culture, Ibaraki University manages Rokkakudō, an hexagonal wooden retreat overlooking the sea along the Izura coast in Kitaibaraki, Ibaraki Prefecture, that was designed by Okakura and built in 1905. It is registered as a national monument.

Books 
The Ideals of the East (London: J. Murray, 1903)
The Awakening of Japan (New York: Century, 1904)
The Book of Tea (New York: Putnam's, 1906)

See also
 Teaism
 Rokkakudō
 Tomonubu Imamichi
 das in-der-Welt-sein
 Tenshin Memorial Museum of Art, Ibaraki

References

Additional sources 
 Bharucha, Rustom. Another Asia: Rabindranath Tagore and Okakura Tenshin. New York: Oxford University Press, 2006. .
 "We Must Do a Better Job of Explaining Japan to the World". Asahi Shimbun, August 12, 2005.
 Benfey, Christopher. The Great Wave: Gilded Age Misfits, Japanese Eccentrics, and the Opening of Old Japan. New York: Random House, 2003. .
 Okakura Kakuzo, The Illustrated Book of Tea. Chiang Mai: Cognoscenti Books. 2012. ASIN: B009033C6M
 Westin, Victoria. Japanese Painting and National Identity: Okakura Tenshin and His Circle. Center for Japanese Studies University of Michigan (2003).

External links 
 
 
 
 
 "History of Japanese Art" by Okakura Kakuzo (English Translation)
 Kokka and the Early Neo-Bengal School Masters by Satyasri Ukil 
 An Artist Remembered by Satyasri Ukil 
 Forget Okakura by Niraj Kumar

1863 births
1913 deaths
Japanese writers
English-language writers from Japan
Museum of Fine Arts, Boston
People from Yokohama
University of Tokyo alumni
People of Meiji-period Japan
Shinbutsu bunri
History of art in Japan
Japanese magazine founders